The Vassa (both "rain") is the three-month annual retreat observed by Theravada practitioners. Taking place during the wet season, Vassa lasts for three lunar months, usually from July (the Burmese month of Waso) to October (the Burmese month of Thadingyut ).

In English, Vassa is often glossed as Rains Retreat or Buddhist Lent, the latter by analogy to the Christian Lent (which Vassa predates by at least five centuries)

For the duration of Vassa, monastics remain in one place, typically a monastery or temple grounds. In some monasteries, monks dedicate the Vassa to intensive meditation. Some Buddhist lay people choose to observe Vassa by adopting more ascetic practices, such as giving up meat, alcohol, or smoking. In Thailand, the sale of alcohol is prohibited on the first and last days of Vassa, known as "Khao Phansa" and "Wan Ok Phansa".  While Vassa is sometimes casually called "Buddhist Lent", others object to this terminology. Commonly, the number of years a monk has spent in monastic life is expressed by counting the number of vassas (or rains) since ordination.

Mahayana Buddhists also observe Vassa. Vietnamese Thiền and Korean Seon monastics observe an equivalent retreat of three months of intensive practice in one location, a practice also observed in Tibetan Buddhism.

Vassa begins on the first day of the waning moon of the eighth lunar month, which is the day after Asalha Puja or Asalha Uposatha ("Dhamma day"). It ends on Pavarana, when all monastics come before the sangha and atone for any offense that might have been committed during Vassa.

Vassa is followed by Kathina, a festival in which the laity expresses gratitude to monks. Lay Buddhists bring donations to temples, especially new robes for the monks.

The Vassa tradition predates the time of Gautama Buddha. It was a long-standing custom for mendicant ascetics in India not to travel during the rainy season as they may unintentionally harm crops, insects or even themselves during their travels. Many Buddhist ascetics live in regions which lack a rainy season. Consequently, there are places where Vassa may not be typically observed.

See also 
 Asalha Puja
 Monsoon of South Asia
 Wan Ok Phansa
 Esala Mangallaya
 Thadingyut Festival
 Ubon Ratchathani Candle Festival
 Kathina
 Pavarana
 Uposatha
 Vesak
 Ango

References

Buddhist festivals
Buddhist festivals in India
Buddhist festivals in Thailand
Public holidays in Thailand
July observances
August observances
September observances
October observances
Observances set by the Burmese calendar
Spiritual retreats
Theravada
Buddhist festivals in Myanmar
Buddhist festivals in Cambodia
Buddhist festivals in Laos
Public holidays in Myanmar